Jung Do Kwan was founded in 1956 by Young Woo Lee, and was the last of the original nine Kwans that formed the Kukkiwon. This is detailed in "A Modern History of Taekwondo" by Kyong Myong Lee and Kang Won Sik (1999).

An original student of the Chung Do Kwan, Young Woo Lee was advised by the current Chung Do Kwan president to choose a similar name to Chung Do Kwan, so he chose Jung Do Kwan. 

Young Woo Lee died in August 2006 in Seoul, Korea.  Until his death, he remained active in the World Taekwondo Federation, and served on the Dan/Poom black Belt promotion committee of the Kukkiwon. 

Taekwondo Jung Do Kwan still exists today, but only as a fraternal social friendship club. The official training curriculum endorsed by Taekwondo Jung Do Kwan is the Kukkiwon curriculum. The new President of the Jung Do Kwan is Grand Master Seo Myeong Ki.

Meaning
The word jung can be translated as righteous while do means way. So Jung Do Kwan can be translated as school of the righteous way.

References

Taekwondo kwans